The Bickerton Baronetcy, of Upwood in the County of Huntingdon, was a title in the Baronetage of Great Britain. It was created on 29 May 1778 for Sir Richard Bickerton, a successful British naval commander who later rose to the rank of rear admiral and represented Rochester in the British House of Commons. His son, Sir Richard Bickerton, 2nd Baronet, also became a Royal Navy officer before succeeding to the baronetcy in 1792. He became a Lord of the Admiralty, represented Poole in the House of Commons, and rose to the rank of admiral. The baronetcy became extinct on his death in 1832.

Bickerton baronets, of Upwood (1778)
Sir Richard Bickerton, 1st Baronet (1727–1792)
Sir Richard Hussey Bickerton, 2nd Baronet (1759–1832)

References

Extinct baronetcies in the Baronetage of Great Britain